Kavikulguru Kalidas Sanskrit University (KKSU) is an institution dedicated to the advanced learning of Sanskrit, which is considered one of the oldest languages on earth.

History

The university is in Ramtek in the state of Maharashtra in India. It provides coursework in Bachelor of Arts (B.A.), Bachelor of Education (B.Ed.), Master of Arts (M.A.), Master of Philosophy (M.Phil.), and a Ph.D. degree. KKSU ifocuses on a modern approach to the Sanskrit language. In addition to preserving traditional Sanskrit, it emphasizes on the study of science and technology in ancient India, which is exclusively described in old Sanskrit texts.

History
Since January 2022 Madhusūdana pennā is the vice-chancellor of KKSU.

References

External links
 

Universities in Maharashtra
Sanskrit universities in India
Nagpur district
Educational institutions established in 1997
1997 establishments in Maharashtra